Sophie Frederica Alohilani von Haselberg (born November 14, 1986) is an American actress, best known for co-starring in the Woody Allen film Irrational Man.

Early life and education
von Haselberg was born in Los Angeles, California, the daughter of actress and singer Bette Midler and artist Martin von Haselberg. Her father is of German descent and her mother is of Jewish-American descent. She attended the Ethical Culture Fieldston School in New York City. She then studied sociology and East Asian studies at Yale University, worked at an ad agency in China and returned to Yale to study acting at the drama school in 2011.

Career
von Haselberg's NYC theatre debut was in October 2014 at The Vineyard in a play entitled Billy and Ray.

In 2015, von Haselberg had a role in the Woody Allen film Irrational Man. Allen stated, "She's wonderful. She came in with a lot of other women that read and she's the spitting image of her [mother] and she was just good... I thought she was so good that I combined her part. There was another part too and when I gave her the role, then I dropped the other character out of the movie and worked it so that she could have a double role, so could appear more frequently 'cause she was impressive… She projects intelligence because she's intelligent."

In 2015, von Haselberg was cast in a pilot for MTV starring Nicole Byer.  In October 2015, she started shooting The Wizard of Lies for HBO. In 2017, she filmed the role of Joyce in the historical drama film Ask for Jane, released the following year. 

In 2018, she played Linda Elwell in FX's The Assassination of Gianni Versace: American Crime Story. She appeared in season 2, episode 1 and the Season Finale of FX's Pose as ACT UP activist Syd.

Personal life
On June 6, 2020, von Haselberg married Harry J. N. Guinness in Millbrook, New York, at the home of her parents.

References

External links

1986 births
American actresses
American people of German descent
Jewish American actresses
Living people
Bette Midler
Yale School of Drama alumni
Yale College alumni